Westminster Street Historic District is a commercial historic district consisting of six buildings along the north side of Westminster Street in Providence, Rhode Island, a short way west of Interstate 95.  Three of the buildings are located just west of Dean Street, while the other three are just to its east.  Five of the six buildings were constructed between 1870 and 1900, and the sixth in 1933.  These five, the most prominent of which is the Burrows Block are uniformly built of brick and masonry, while the Chiapinelli Block, at the eastern end of the district, is an Art Deco office building with a concrete main facade and brick sidewalls.

The district was listed on the National Register of Historic Places in 2003.

Gallery

See also

National Register of Historic Places listings in Providence, Rhode Island

References

Historic districts in Providence County, Rhode Island
Geography of Providence, Rhode Island
National Register of Historic Places in Providence, Rhode Island
Historic districts on the National Register of Historic Places in Rhode Island